Nicholas Carlier (born 23 March 1968) is a former English cricketer and a right-handed batsman.  He was born in Belper, Derbyshire.

Carlier represented the Essex Cricket Board in 3 List A matches.  The first was against Ireland in the 1999 NatWest Trophy. The second and third matches were against the Lancashire Cricket Board and Warwickshire, both in the 2000 NatWest Trophy.  In his 3 List A matches, he scored 92 runs at a batting average of 30.66, with a single half century high score of 56.  In the field he took a single catch.

References

External links
Nicholas Carlier at Cricinfo
Nicholas Carlier at CricketArchive

1968 births
Living people
People from Belper
Cricketers from Derbyshire
English cricketers
Essex Cricket Board cricketers